Véronique Augereau (born 25 May 1957) is a French actress who is notably active in dubbing. She is especially known for providing the voice of Marge Simpson in the French version of the animated series The Simpsons.

She is the wife of Philippe Peythieu, who voices Homer Simpson, so also husband and wife in real life.

References

External links

French voice actresses
1957 births
Living people                                                           
Place of birth missing (living people)
20th-century French actresses
21st-century French actresses
French voice directors